Forest Avenue Historic District may refer to:

Forest Avenue Historic District (Elberton, Georgia)
Forest Avenue Historic District (Vermillion, South Dakota)
East Forest Avenue Historic District, Neenah, Wisconsin